Victory is an unincorporated community in Jackson County, Oklahoma, United States. The community is five miles west of Altus and one mile north of US Route 62. The Salt Fork Red River flows past east of the community.

Notable person
Herschal Crow, Oklahoma state senator and state cabinet secretary, was born in Victory.

Notes

Populated places in Jackson County, Oklahoma
Unincorporated communities in Oklahoma